Sphaerocystis is a genus of green algae, specifically of the class Chlorophyceae.

References
 
 

Chlamydomonadales genera
Chlamydomonadales